The MPI HSP46 is a four-axle AC-traction diesel-electric locomotive for commuter trains, designed and assembled by MotivePower. It meets EPA Tier 3 emissions standards. The launch customer is the Massachusetts Bay Transportation Authority (MBTA), whose first unit entered revenue service in April 2014.

Design
The locomotives are powered by GE GEVO-12 diesel engines from GE Transportation Systems, equipped with a static inverter for head end power, and capable of meeting the stringent new Tier 3 emissions regulations. AC traction systems, prime movers, head end power equipment, and computer systems are supplied by GE, while MPI supplies the brake systems, air systems, and cooling systems.

The locomotive was styled by industrial designer Cesar Vergara, who also designed the GE Genesis.

History

In the mid-2000s the MBTA issued a request for proposal for new diesel locomotives to replace its aging fleet, much of which dated to the late 1970s. Two firms responded: Vossloh España S.A. and MotivePower. MBTA selected Vossloh, but the Federal Transit Administration rejected the MBTA's request for a "Buy America Act" waiver because the MBTA "has not identified a significant technological difference between locomotives produced by Vossloh and MotivePower", and that it has "not established sufficient grounds for a public interest waiver". MBTA turned to MotivePower, and ordered 20 new HSP46 locomotives on July 14, 2010, at a cost of $114.6 million.

On July 27, 2011, the MBTA released images of a new paint scheme for the authority's HSP46 fleet. It was chosen by the general public in an online survey.

On July 11, 2012, the MBTA Board voted to approve the first option for 7 locomotives, bringing the order total to 27 units. On April 10, 2013, the Board approved the purchase of the remaining 13 option locomotives, bringing the current order total to 40 units (2000–2039), at a total cost of $240 million.

On October 24, 2013, the first pilot unit, No. 2001, was delivered to the MBTA Commuter Rail Maintenance Facility to begin testing and training. Two other pilot units were also released from MotivePower: No. 2000 to GE's Test Facility in Erie, Pennsylvania, and No. 2003 to the Transportation Technology Center test facility in Pueblo, Colorado. Only No. 2001 was given the MBTA paint scheme; the other two test units were unpainted.

On April 16, 2014, No. 2001 entered revenue service, with its first round trip taking place on the Haverhill Line. , 36 of the 40 locomotives are in service. En route to the MBTA, the locomotives were sent to the Providence and Worcester Railroad, which is subcontracted to MPI to prepare the units for revenue service.

In August 2014, MPI discovered that some traction motor bearings had been shipped improperly to their factory, causing early failures. Locomotives already delivered to the MBTA were repaired on-site, while half of the locomotives were redirected to Altoona Works during delivery for replacement bearings to be installed. The issues were not disclosed to the press until January 2015. While the repairs were performed under warranty at no cost to the MBTA, they constituted an additional delay that prevented some of the units from entering service before the end of 2015. The multiple delays and early mechanical issues have raised concern from industry commentators about the MBTA's procurement process and the overall quality of the locomotives.

Despite the repairs, the HSP46s have continued to experience mechanical problems. Turbochargers failed in several locomotives beginning in Fall 2016, and will have to be replaced fleet-wide. Fleet availability fell to 27 of 40 in early April 2017.

References

External links

MotivePower, Inc.
GE Transportation
HSP46 spec sheet

MPI locomotives
B-B locomotives
Passenger locomotives
Diesel-electric locomotives of the United States
EPA Tier 3-compliant locomotives of the United States
Railway locomotives introduced in 2013
Standard gauge locomotives of the United States